Argent is the debut album by British rock band Argent. Released in 1970 on CBS Records (USA: Epic Records, BN 26525), the album did not chart in either the U.S. or the UK and did not produce any hit singles, although the song "Liar" would become a top-10 Billboard hit the following year through a cover version by Three Dog Night. ("Liar" b/w "Schoolgirl" was issued in the US as a 45 on Date, before CBS moved the band to their Epic label.) The track "Dance in the Smoke" was made popular in the UK by its inclusion on the best-selling CBS Sampler album Fill Your Head with Rock (1970).

Track listing
Songs written by Rod Argent and Chris White except as noted.

Personnel
Argent
 Russ Ballard – guitar, lead (2-4, 6, 9, 10) and backing vocals, piano (6)
 Rod Argent – organ, backing and lead (1, 5, 7, 8) vocals, electric and acoustic pianos
 Jim Rodford – bass, backing  vocals
 Robert Henrit – drums, percussion
Technical
Jerry Boys – engineer
Tony Lane – artwork, cover design
A two-disc CD re-issue of this album plus Ring of Hands was released by BGO Records in 2000.

References

Argent (band) albums
1970 debut albums
CBS Records albums
Albums produced by Rod Argent
Albums produced by Chris White (musician)